'Mungode,' 'Munugodu' or 'Munugode' is a village located in Munugode Mandal in Nalgonda Division of Nalgonda district of Telangana state, India. It is 21 Kilometers westward from Nalgonda town. Munugode village has a population of 10141, of which 5294 are males, while 4847 are females, as per Population Census 2011.

Geography and villages
It has an average elevation of 241 metres (793 ft).

1. Kistapuram

2. Koratikal

3. Chikati Mamidi

4. Kompally

5. Palivela

6. Laxmidevigudem

7. Ravi Gudem

8. Kachalapuram

9. Madunapuram

10. Rathipally

11. Gundlori Gudem

12. Gangori Gudem

13. Gudapur

14. Velmakanne

15. Kalvakuntla

16. Cholledu

17. Vookondi

18. Singaram.

References

Mandal headquarters in Nalgonda district